Wolfgang Radmacher (born 30 December 1946, in Borna) is a German former wrestler who competed in the 1972 Summer Olympics.

References

External links
 

1946 births
Living people
Olympic wrestlers of East Germany
Wrestlers at the 1972 Summer Olympics
German male sport wrestlers